Scarus is a genus of parrotfishes. With 52 currently recognised extant species, it is by far the largest genus in this family. The vast majority are found at reefs in the Indo-Pacific, but a small number of species are found in the warmer parts of the eastern Pacific and the western Atlantic, with a single species, Scarus hoefleri in the eastern Atlantic. Most are very colourful, and have strikingly different initial (males and females) and terminal (males only) phases.

Species
There are currently 52 recognised species in this genus:

Scarus altipinnis (Steindachner, 1879) (filament-finned parrotfish)
Scarus arabicus (Steindachner, 1902) (Arabian parrotfish)
Scarus caudofasciatus (Günther, 1862) (red-barred parrotfish)
Scarus chameleon Choat & Randall, 1986 (chameleon parrotfish)
Scarus chinensis (Steindachner, 1867)
Scarus coelestinus Valenciennes, 1840 (midnight parrotfish)
Scarus coeruleus (Edwards, 1771) (blue parrotfish)
Scarus collana Rüppell, 1835 (Red Sea parrotfish)
Scarus compressus (Osburn & Nichols 1916) (azure parrotfish)
Scarus dimidiatus Bleeker, 1859 (yellow-barred parrotfish)
Scarus dubius (Bennett, 1828) (regal parrotfish)
Scarus falcipinnis (Playfair, 1868) (sicklefin parrotfish)
Scarus ferrugineus Forsskål, 1775 (rusty parrotfish)
Scarus festivus Valenciennes, 1840 (festive parrotfish)
Scarus flavipectoralis Schultz, 1958 (yellowfin parrotfish)
Scarus forsteni  (Bleeker, 1861) (Forsten's parrotfish)
Scarus frenatus Lacépède, 1802 (bridled parrotfish)
Scarus fuscocaudalis Randall & Myers, 2000 (darktail parrotfish)
Scarus fuscopurpureus (Klunzinger, 1871) (purple-brown parrotfish)
Scarus ghobban Forsskål, 1775 (blue-barred parrotfish)
Scarus globiceps Valenciennes, 1840 (globehead parrotfish)
Scarus gracilis (Steindachner 1869)
Scarus guacamaia Cuvier, 1829 (rainbow parrotfish)
Scarus hoefleri (Steindachner, 1881) (Guinean parrotfish)
Scarus hypselopterus Bleeker, 1853 (yellowtail parrotfish)
Scarus iseri (Bloch, 1789) (striped parrotfish)
Scarus koputea Randall & Choat, 1980 (Marquesan parrotfish)
Scarus longipinnis Randall & Choat, 1980 (highfin parrotfish)
Scarus maculipinna Westneat, Satapoomin & Randall, 2007 (Spot-fin parrotfish) 
Scarus niger Forsskål, 1775 (dusky parrotfish)
Scarus obishime Randall & Earle, 1993 (yellowtail parrotfish)
Scarus oviceps Valenciennes, 1840 (dark-capped parrotfish)
Scarus ovifrons Temminck & Schlegel, 1846 knobsnout parrotfish
Scarus perrico Jordan & Gilbert, 1882 (bumphead parrotfish)
Scarus persicus Randall & Bruce, 1983 (gulf parrotfish)
Scarus prasiognathos Valenciennes, 1840 (Singapore parrotfish)
Scarus psittacus Forsskål 1775 (common parrotfish)
Scarus quoyi Valenciennes, 1840 (Quoy's parrotfish)
Scarus rivulatus Valenciennes, 1840 (rivulated parrotfish)
Scarus rubroviolaceus Bleeker, 1847 (ember parrotfish)
Scarus russelii Valenciennes, 1840 (eclipse parrotfish)
Scarus scaber Valenciennes, 1840 (fivesaddle parrotfish)
Scarus schlegeli Bleeker, 1867 (yellowband parrotfish)
Scarus spinus (Kner) (greensnout parrotfish)
Scarus taeniopterus Lesson, 1829 (princess parrotfish)
Scarus tricolor Bleeker, 1847 (tricolour parrotfish)
Scarus trispinosus Valenciennes, 1840 (greenback parrotfish)
Scarus vetula Bloch & Schneider, 1801 (queen parrotfish)
Scarus viridifucatus J.L.B. Smith, 1956 (roundhead parrotfish)
Scarus xanthopleura Bleeker, 1853 (red parrotfish)
Scarus zelindae  Moura, Figueiredo & Sazima, 2001 (Zelinda's parrotfish)
Scarus zufar Randall & Hoover, 1995 (Dhofar parrotfish)

In political thought
In Cesare Ripa's Renaissance iconography, the scarus fish symbolised civil "Union," i.e. the joining together of individuals into a collective body. Plutarch had written that scarus fish "swim together in shoals and ingeniously and heroically free each other when caught in a net." The scarus thus "denoted reciprocal assistance in the fight for survival."

Gallery

References

 
Scaridae
Extant Rupelian first appearances
Marine fish genera
Taxa named by Peter Forsskål
Rupelian genus first appearances
Taxonomy articles created by Polbot